Volleyball has been in the Central American Games event since the first inaugural edition in 1973 in Guatemala City, Guatemala Since then the volleyball competitions for both men and women was presented in all editions except the 2006 Central American Games Edition That was Cancelled at that time.

Indoor Volleyball

Men's tournaments

Summaries 

 A round-robin tournament determined the final standings.

Medal summary

Women's tournaments

Summaries 

 A round-robin tournament determined the final standings.

Medal summary

References

External links 
 AFECAVOL 
 Central American Index Todor66

Central American Games
Volleyball in Central America